PVK Jadran is a professional water polo club based in Herceg Novi, Montenegro. As of 2021–22 season, the club competes in the Montenegrin League and Regional League A1.

PVK Jadran is a 16-time winner of the National league (10 Montenegro, 2 SFR Yugoslavia, 4 Serbia & Montenegro), 13-time winner of the National cup (10 Montenegro, 3 SFR Yugoslavia), 2-time winner of the Regional Water Polo League, and 1-time runner-up of the LEN Champions League.

History
PVK Jadran was founded in the summer of 1922 as a merger between two water polo clubs, Bijela Vila and Spjaža. It was then registered at the Swimming Federation of Yugoslavia. It was the only water club in the Bay of Kotor region and played against teams from Dubrovnik. PVK Jadran's first win was when they had beaten VK Građani, the best clubs in Yugoslavia at the time after VK Jug and VK Jadran.

After World War II in 1945, the national championship was held in Ljubljana and Jadran went, representing Montenegro, and won fourth place. 
Jadran also played final game in the Euroleague in 2004 where was defeated by Honved.

In 2018–19 season, PVK Jadran was a runner-up in 2018–19 LEN Euro Cup, after losing on aggregate with 16–15 to the French team Marseille.

Notable former players

Boris Zloković
  Božidar Stanišić
  Petar Prlainović
  Rajko Prlainović
  
Petar Prlainović

  Aleksandar Ivović
  Vladimir Gojković
      Andrija Prlainović
  Nikola Janović
      Vanja Udovičić
  Aleksandar Radović
  Miloš Šćepanović
      Denis Šefik
       Danijel Premuš 
 Marko Jelača
 Marko Elez
  Nikola Vukčević

Notable former coaches
  Petar Porobić

Former squads

2007–08 squad
 Višeslav Sarić (Feb 2, 1977) 
 Drago Pejaković (May 28, 1980)
 Marko Elez (Sep 9, 1980)
 Danijel Premuš (Apr 15, 1981)
 Miloš Šćepanović (Oct 9, 1982) (Goalkeeper)
 Richard van Eck (Mar 8, 1983)
 Nikola Vukčević (Nov 14, 1985)
 Ljubomir Vrbica (Sep 8, 1985)
 Aleksandar Ivović (Feb 24, 1986)
 Kevin Graham (Apr 21, 1986)
 Novak Jelić (Jan 14, 1986) (Goalkeeper)
 Luka Sekulić (Jul 1, 1987)
 Aleksandar Radović (Feb 24, 1987)
 Filip Klikovac (Feb 7, 1989)

2008–2009 squad
 Miloš Šćepanović (Goalkeeper)
 Luka Sekulić 
 Kevin Graham 
 Marko Elez 
 Nikola Vukčević 
 Aleksandar Radović 
 Marko Jelača 
 Vladimir Gojković 
 Aleksandar Ivović
 Drago Pejaković 
 Danijel Premuš 
 Jesse Smith 
 Dalibor Perčinić (Goalkeeper)

2009–10 squad
 Miloš Šćepanović (Goalkeeper)
 Luka Sekulić 
 Ivan Bebić 
 Marko Elez 
 Nikola Vukčević 
 Aleksandar Radović 
 Nikola Janović 
 Vladimir Gojković 
 Aleksandar Ivović
 Boris Zloković 
 Filip Klikovac  
 Dalibor Perčinić (Goalkeeper)
 Đorđe Tešanović
Head Coach :  Ivica Tucak
2nd Coach :  Vaso Ćuković
3rd Coach :  Lazar Vuksanović

2010–2011 squad
 Miloš Šćepanović (Goalkeeper)
 Luka Sekulić 
 Damir Crepulja 
 Nikola Janović 
 Đorđe Filipović
 Radovan Latinović 
 Uroš Kalinić 
 Vladimir Gojković 
 Danijel Premuš
 Gavril Subotić 
 Petar Filipović  
 Željko Kovačić
 Đorđe Tešanović
 Stefan Vidović
Head Coach :  Ivica Tucak
2nd Coach :  Vaso Ćuković
3rd Coach :  Lazar Vuksanović

2011–12 squad
 Miloš Šćepanović (Goalkeeper)
 Luka Sekulić 
 Jovan Sarić 
 Ivan Krizman 
 Martin Beltrame 
 Radovan Latinović 
 Stefan Vidović 
 Vladimir Gojković 
 Danijel Premuš
 Gavril Subotić 
 Nikola Tomašević  
 Bojan Banićević
 Đorđe Tešanović
 Petar Vuksanović
 Slaven Kandić (Goalkeeper)
Head Coach :  Ivica Tucak
2nd Coach :  Vaso Ćuković
3rd Coach :  Lazar Vuksanović

2012–13 squad
 Miloš Šćepanović (Goalkeeper)
 Clayton Snyder
 Aleksa Brkić 
 Đorđe Tešanović 
 Stefan Vidović 
 Aleksandar Radović 
 Bojan Banićević 
 Jovan Sarić 
 Radovan Latinović
 Igor Porobić 
 Lazar Pasuljević  
 Nikola Tomašević
 Ivan Krizman
 Nikola Giga
 Vlado Popadić
 Slaven Kandić (Goalkeeper)
Head Coach :  Vladimir Gojković
2nd Coach :  Petar Radanović
3rd Coach :  Lazar Vuksanović

2013–14 squad
 Slaven Kandić (Goalkeeper)
 Nikola Moskov 
 Vlado Popadić 
 Željko Kovačić 
 Stefan Vidović 
 Marko Brajović 
 Bojan Banićević 
 Jovan Sarić 
 Radovan Latinović
 Luka Sekulić 
 Stefan Pješivac  
 Aleksa Ukropina
 Nikola Giga
 Marko Porobić
 Stefan Porobić
 Vladan Spaić
 Miloš Popović (Goalkeeper)

Head Coach :  Vladimir Gojković
2nd Coach :  Petar Radanović
3rd Coach :  Lazar Vuksanović

2014–15 squad
 Slaven Kandić (Goalkeeper)
 Nikola Moskov 
 Vlado Popadić 
 Andria Bitadze
 Stefan Vidović 
 Bojan Banićević 
 Jovan Sarić
 Dragan Drašković
 Radovan Latinović
 Luka Sekulić 
 Stefan Pješivac  
 Aleksa Ukropina
 Nikola Giga
 Stefan Porobić
 Vladan Spaić
 Filip Gardašević
 Nikola Brkić
 Đuro Radović
 Petar Mijušković
 Petar Tešanović (Goalkeeper)
 Miloš Popović (Goalkeeper)
Head Coach :  Vladimir Gojković
2nd Coach :  Petar Radanović
3rd Coach :  Lazar Vuksanović

2015–16 squad
 Slaven Kandić (Goalkeeper)
 Aleksa Petrovski 
 Vlado Popadić 
 Đuro Radović 
 Stefan Vidović 
 Bojan Banićević 
 Nikola Janović
 Miroslav Ranđić
 Vladan Spaić
 Željko Kovačić 
 Stefan Pješivac  
 Aleksa Ukropina
 Nikola Moskov
 Nikola Brkić
 Petar Mijušković
 Filip Gardašević
 Miloš Popović (Goalkeeper)
 Dragan Kolesko (Goalkeeper)
 Petar Tešanović (Goalkeeper)

2016–17 squad
 Miloš Šćepanović (Goalkeeper)
 Slaven Kandić (Goalkeeper)
 Marko Petković
 Vlado Popadić 
 Đuro Radović 
 Stefan Vidović 
 Bojan Banićević 
 Nikola Janović
 Danil Merkulov
 Vladan Spaić
 Željko Kovačić 
 Stefan Pješivac  
 Aleksa Ukropina
 Nikola Moskov
 Nikola Brkić
 Stefan Porobić
 Petar Mijušković
 Filip Gardašević
 Luka Murišić
 Danilo Radović
 Martin Gardašević
 Dragan Kolesko (Goalkeeper)
 Petar Tešanović (Goalkeeper)

Head Coach :  Vladimir Gojković
2nd Coach :  Petar Radanović
3rd Coach :  Lazar Vuksanović

Recent seasons

Rankings in Montenegrin First League

In European competition

References

External links
 

Water polo clubs in Montenegro
Water polo clubs in Serbia and Montenegro